Neotripodiscus is an ichnogenus of reptile footprint from Lesotho.

See also

 List of dinosaur ichnogenera

References

Reptile trace fossils
Fossil taxa described in 1970